"Mother Earth" is an episode of the BBC sitcom, The Green Green Grass. It was first screened on 6 October 2006, as the fourth episode of series two.

Synopsis

Marlene tries to set up a massage and beauty parlour in the house, using Boycie as her guinea pig. During his therapy Marlene manages to semi-paralyse her husband whilst giving him a massage. Tyler and Beth are getting closer, but when Beth has been coming to the farm lately she has been seeing some strange goings-on involving Boycie and Marlene. It doesn't help matters when she sees Boycie totally naked in the living room of the house either!

Episode cast

References

British TV Comedy Guide for The Green Green Grass
BARB viewing figures

2006 British television episodes
The Green Green Grass episodes